Volland may refer to:
 Volland, Kansas, a community in the United States
 11056 Volland, main belt asteroid
 Volland-Stern Model, geomagnetism model
 P. F. Volland Company, a publisher

People 
 Kevin Volland (born 1992), German footballer
 Michael Volland (born 1974), British Anglican priest and academic
 Ernst Volland (born 1946), German artist, photographer, cartoonist, gallerist, curator and writer
 Sophie Volland, a correspondent and a mistress of Denis Diderot

See also 
 Voland